Bug Attack is a fixed shooter video game written by Jim Nitchals for the Apple II and published by Cavalier Computer in 1981. An Atari 8-bit family version was released in 1982.

Gameplay
Bug Attack is a game in which the player uses beetles to fight other insects.

Reception
Dave Jones reviewed the game for Computer Gaming World, and stated that "the novel touches of Bug Attack, such as the variety of vegetations and patterns of color, and the intermissions which break up the action between insect waves, served to maintain my interest in the game hour after hour. The author of the game is to be complemented on his packing such a successful combination of imaginative flair and technical expertise into the confines of the Apple II."

Reviews
Softline
Softalk
Electronic Games
1984 Software Encyclopedia from Electronic Games
Book of Atari Software 1983
Creative Computing

References

External links
Review in InCider

1981 video games
Apple II games
Atari 8-bit family games
Fixed shooters
FM-7 games
NEC PC-8801 games
Video games about insects
Video games developed in the United States